The Grants Pass Daily Courier is an independent, family-owned daily newspaper published in Grants Pass, Oregon, United States. The Daily Courier covers Grants Pass and the surrounding area and is delivered throughout Josephine County, as well as parts of Jackson and Douglas counties. It was established in 1885 and is owned by Courier Publishing Company. The Daily Courier is an evening paper published Tuesday through Friday and Sunday. Its weekday circulation is 11,383 and its Sunday circulation is 12,488. It is the newspaper of record for Josephine County.

History
The first year it was published, the paper was known as the Grant's Pass Courier. From 1886 until 1919, it was named the Rogue River Courier. The name was changed again to Grants Pass Daily Courier to avoid confusion after the town of Woodville changed its name to Rogue River. Much of the success of the paper in its first few decades has been attributed to A. E. Voorhies, its longtime publisher. The paper briefly published a daily bulletin in 1898 during the Spanish American War, and established regular daily publication schedule in 1910.

The Daily Courier is the oldest continuously published newspaper in Southern Oregon. It took the title in 2019 when the Ashland Daily Tidings closed. When the Courier became a daily in 1910, Grants Pass was the smallest city in the world to have leased wire service from the United Press.

The Daily Courier received the 2018 Baker Public Service Award from the Oregon Newspaper Publishers Association for its coverage of the Taylor Creek and Klondike wildfires. Reporters for the Daily Courier won the Bruce Baer Award for Oregon journalism in 1988 and 1992, as well as a special recognition in 1987.

When the Medford Mail-Tribune suddenly closed on January - Friday the 13th - 2023, the Daily Courier said it hoped to expand its coverage area to fill the gap.

References

External links
Grants Pass Daily Courier (official website)
Historic image of the Rogue River Courier from the University of Washington Libraries

1885 establishments in Oregon
Grants Pass, Oregon
Newspapers published in Jackson County, Oregon
Newspapers published in Oregon
Oregon Newspaper Publishers Association
Publications established in 1885